The University of Antwerp is a major Belgian university located in the city of Antwerp. The official abbreviation is UAntwerp. The University of Antwerp has about 20,000 students, which makes it the third-largest university in Flanders. The University of Antwerp is characterised by its high standards in education, internationally competitive research and entrepreneurial approach. It was founded in 2003 after the merger of three smaller universities.

The University of Antwerp ranks as 143rd globally according to 2022 Times Higher Education ranking, 223rd according to 2019 QS World University Rankings and between the 201 and 300th place according to the Academic Ranking of World Universities. The university ranked 7th in the Times Higher Education Ranking for Young Universities (2019) and 18th in the QS University Ranking Top 50 Under 50 (2020). In ten domains the university's research is among the best in the world: Drug Discovery and Development; Ecology and Sustainable Development; Port, Transport and Logistics; Imaging; Infectious Diseases; Materials Characterisation; Neurosciences; Socio-economic Policy and Organisation; Public Policy and Political Science; Urban History and Contemporary Urban Policy.

In September 2020, the University of Antwerp chose to start the new academic year with stricter coronavirus measures than those recommended by the government.

History

Origins
The university's roots go back to Sint-Ignatius Handelshogeschool (Saint-Ignatius School for Higher Education in Commerce) founded by the Jesuit (Society of Jesus) in Antwerp in 1852. This was one of the first European business schools to offer formal university degrees. It later opened a Faculty of Literature and Philosophy (including Law) and a Faculty of Political and Social Sciences. It was renamed Universitaire Faculteiten Sint-Ignatius Antwerpen (UFSIA)
in the 1960s when the Belgian government granted it university status. In the early 1970s UFSIA joined into a confederation with "Rijksuniversitair Centrum Antwerpen" (RUCA) and "Universitaire Instelling Antwerpen" (UIA), public institutions.

Merger
In 2003 UFSIA, RUCA, and UIA merged into the University of Antwerp to become the first explicitly pluralistic university in Belgium, offering philosophical, ethical, and spiritual discourse and openness towards religion and intercultural dialogue. It soon became the third largest university in Flanders with 20,000 students. In order to face the challenges posed by the internationalization of European education and research, the university is part of the Antwerp University Association (AUHA). The Catholic influence that the Jesuits had at UFSIA continues through the Saint Ignatius University Centre (UCSIA), Antwerp, founded in 2003.

Faculties
The University of Antwerp has 30 academic bachelor programmes, 69 master programmes, 20 master-after-master programmes and 22 postgraduates. In addition, there are 26 programmes completely taught in English (1 bachelor, 16 master, 6 master-after-master and 3 postgraduate programmes). All of these programmes are divided into 9 faculties.

Business and Economics 
Pharmaceutical, Veterinary and Biomedical Sciences
Medicine and Health Sciences
Arts 
Design Sciences (including architecture and conservation)
Social Sciences
Law
Applied Engineering Sciences
Science

The Institute of Development Policy and Management (IOB) has an autonomous faculty-like UAntwerp status and Antwerp Management School is an autonomous school within the University of Antwerp.

Campuses

The six campuses are located all over the city of Antwerp, from the historic city centre to the green belt to the south of the city.
 Stadscampus: Prinsstraat 13, 2000 Antwerpen
 Campus Mutsaard: Mutsaardstraat 31, 2000 Antwerpen
 Campus Paardenmarkt: Paardenmarkt 92, 2000 Antwerpen
 Campus Drie Eiken: Universiteitsplein 1, 2610 Wilrijk (Antwerpen)
 Campus Middelheim: Middelheimlaan 1, 2020 Antwerpen
 Campus Groenenborger: Groenenborgerlaan 171, 2020 Antwerpen

Academic ranking

In the 2010 QS World University Rankings the University of Antwerp was ranked 179th overall in the world. On the 2009 THE–QS World University Rankings list (in 2010 Times Higher Education World University Rankings and QS World University Rankings parted ways to produce separate rankings), University of Antwerp was ranked on a shared 177th place. An overview of the THE-QS World University Rankings up to 2011:

Times Higher Education World University Ranking:

Notable alumni

Economics
 Marcia De Wachter (1953–), director of the National Bank of Belgium
 Patrick Janssens (1956–), politician (Flemish MP, former mayor of Antwerp)
 Mimi Lamote (1964–), CEO Mayerline
 Philippe Muyters (1961–), politician (Flemish minister)

History
 Bart De Wever, (1970-), politician (representative, floor leader New Flemish Alliance party and mayor of Antwerp)
 Marie-Rose Morel, politician

Law
 Gerolf Annemans (1958–), politician (representative, floor leader Vlaams Belang party)
 Peter Van Den Bossche (1959-), professor and member of the WTO Appellate Body 
 Cathy Berx (1969–), jurist and politician (governor of the province of Antwerp)
 Jan Grauls (1948–), diplomat (ambassador)
 Mieke Offeciers-Van De Wiele (1952–), politician (former minister)
 Kris Peeters (1962–), politician (Minister-President of Flanders)
 Herman Portocarero (1952–), author and diplomat
 Matthias Storme (1959–), lawyer and politician
 Rudi Thomaes (1952–2018), former CEO of the Federation of Belgian Enterprises
 Bruno Valkeniers, businessman and politician (party leader of Vlaams Belang)
 Staf Van Reet, businessman

Medicine
 Paul Stoffels (1962–), cofounder of Tibotec and Virco
 Manto Tshabalala-Msimang (1940–2009), South African politician

Linguistics and Literature & Philosophy 
 Clara Cleymans (1989–), actress, voice actress and musical theatre singer
 Jan Huyghebaert (1945–), banker
 Jan Leyers (1958–), author, musician and presenter
 Hugo Matthysen (1956–), author, musician and presenter
 Bart Peeters (1959–), musician and presenter
 Matthias Storme (1959–), lawyer and politician

Political and Social Sciences
 Jos Geysels, former politician and chairman 11.11.11
 Patrick Janssens (1956–), politician (Flemish MP, mayor of Antwerp)
 Marthe Wandou (1963–), Cameroonian activist
 Peter Mertens (1969–), politician
 Johan Vande Lanotte (1955–), politician (minister, MP, senator)
 Johan Van Hecke (1954–), member of the European Parliament
 Mieke Vogels (1954–), politician (former minister, Flemish MP)

Sciences
 Dries Buytaert (1978–), author of Drupal
 Didier de Chaffoy de Courcelles (1953–), vice-president R&D of Janssen Pharmaceutica
 Peter Piot (1949–), microbiologist, head of UNAIDS
 Vincent Timmerman, molecular biologist
 Christine Van Broeckhoven (1953–), scientist and politician
 Anthony Liekens (1975–), informaticists, biologist, inventor and educator

Notable faculty
 Marc Bossuyt, law
 Rudy Martens, management 
 Bence Nanay, philosophy
 Christine Van Broeckhoven, molecular biologist
 Christine Van Den Wyngaert, law
 Frank Vandenbroucke, Applied Economics and Social Sciences

Student life

Sports
The University of Antwerp has a long tradition in organizing international student championships. The following FISU, EUSA and IFIUS events have been organized:
 1978: FISU World University Cycling Championship
 1982: FISU World University Cross Country Championship
 1992: FISU World University Chess Championship
 2004: IFIUS World Interuniversity Games
 2006: FISU World University Cycling Championship
 2007: EUSA European University Bridge Championship

Student organisations
At the University of Antwerp there are faculty clubs, regional clubs and political clubs. Faculty bound clubs are governed by VUAS which consists of Unifac and ASK-Stuwer. Political and philosophical clubs are governed by PFK-Antwerpen. The student newspaper is called "Dwars".

See also
 Antwerp Management School
Fastra II
 Flanders Interuniversity Institute of Biotechnology (Vlaams Instituut voor Biotechnologie, VIB)
 Interuniversity Microelectronics Centre (IMEC)
 Performance Analysis of Telecommunication Systems – a telecommunications research group at the university
 Institute of Tropical Medicine Antwerp
 Science and technology in Flanders
 University Foundation
 Utrecht Network
 Waterfront Researchpark

References

External links

 
 

 
Antwerp
2003 establishments in Belgium
Educational institutions established in 1852
Education in Antwerp
Buildings and structures in Antwerp
Organisations based in Antwerp Province
1852 establishments in Belgium
Universities and colleges formed by merger in Belgium